Tobago may refer to:
 Tobago, an island, part of the Republic of Trinidad and Tobago
 Tobago Cays, an archipelago comprising five small uninhabited islands located in the Southern Grenadine
 Great Tobago, an island of the British Virgin Islands in the Caribbean
 Little Tobago, an island, part of the Republic of Trinidad and Tobago
 Little Tobago, British Virgin Islands, an island of the British Virgin Islands in the Caribbean
 , the name of more than one ship of the British Royal Navy
 Tobago - whaler and slave ship
SOCATA TB-10 Tobago, a light aircraft
 45635 Tobago, a British LMS Jubilee Class locomotive